Psydrocercops is a genus of moths in the family Gracillariidae.

Species
Psydrocercops wisteriae (Kuroko, 1982)

External links
Global Taxonomic Database of Gracillariidae (Lepidoptera)

Acrocercopinae
Gracillarioidea genera